Stasys Girėnas (known as Stanley T. Girenas in the US; born Stasys Girskis; October 4, 1893 in Vytogala, Kovno Governorate – July 17, 1933 near Soldin, Germany) was a Lithuanian-American pilot, who died in a non-stop flight attempt with the Lituanica from New York City to Kaunas, Lithuania, in 1933.

Biography 
Girenas was born in Vytogala, in the Šilalė district of Lithuania, then part of the Kovno Governorate of the Russian Empire. In 1910, when he was 17 years old, he emigrated to the United States, and settled in Chicago. As a young man he worked in a printing house. In 1917, upon the entry of the U.S. into World War I, he enlisted in the United States Army, where he was trained as a mechanic. In 1919, after being honorably discharged, he worked as a cab driver, and at the same time learned to fly. He acquired a plane in 1925. Despite being injured in an air crash, he continued flying and working in civil aviation. In 1931 he won the first prize at the Chicago Air Festival for the best landing of a plane with its engine turned off.

Death 

After successfully crossing the Atlantic Ocean in 37 hours and 11 minutes, their plane crashed on July 17, 0:36 AM (Berlin Time) by the village of Kuhdamm, near Soldin, Germany (now Pszczelnik, Myślibórz County, Poland). Difficult weather conditions combined with engine defects were the findings of the official investigation. Both aviators were killed in the crash. They had covered a distance of  without landing, only  short of their final destination.

Awards and honors 
 In New York City, in 1957, the fliers were memorialized with a granite flagstaff showing the pair in bas-relief. The monument is located in Lithuania Square, in Williamsburg, Brooklyn.
 Asteroid 288961 Stasysgirėnas, discovered by astronomers Kazimieras Černis and Justas Zdanavičius in 2004, was named in his memory. The official  was published by the Minor Planet Center on June 9, 2017.

Gallery

References

External links 
 Lithuanian Aviation Museum, Lithuanian Museum Association

1893 births
1933 deaths
People from Šilalė District Municipality
People from Rossiyensky Uyezd
Emigrants from the Russian Empire to the United States
American people of Lithuanian descent
Lithuanian aviators
Lithuanian expatriates in Germany
Aviators killed in aviation accidents or incidents in Germany
Victims of aviation accidents or incidents in 1933